Alexander Robinson (born 1831) was a boatswain's mate of the United States Navy who was awarded the Medal of Honor for gallantry during the American Civil War. He was awarded the medal on 31 December 1864 for actions performed near Wilmington, North Carolina on 25 September 1864.

Personal life 
Not much is known about Robinson's personal life. He is believed to have been born in 1831 in England. His home of record was listed as New York, New York.

Military service 
Robinson enlisted as a boatswain's mate in New York City. He was assigned to the USS Howquah, a screw steamer commissioned the previous year to protect Union shipping. On 25 September 1864, while enforcing a naval blockade near Wilmington, North Carolina, the Howquah was caught in the crossfire between Union ships and Confederate shore batteries.

Robinson's Medal of Honor citation, which describes these events, reads:

Robinson was not presented with the award until 25 August 1868.

References 

1831 births
Year of death missing
United States Navy Medal of Honor recipients
American Civil War recipients of the Medal of Honor